The attorney general of Virginia is an elected constitutional position that holds an executive office in the government of Virginia. Attorneys general are elected for a four-year term in the year following a presidential election. There are no term limits restricting the number of terms someone can serve as attorney general.

History 
In the Colony of Virginia, attorneys general were typically appointed by the king of England, with vacancies in the office filled by the appointment of the colonial governor or lieutenant governor, sometimes in consultation with the governor's council.

Qualifications
The position of attorney general is established by Article V, Section 15 of the Constitution of Virginia, and they are elected for four years and serve concurrently with the governor. All candidates for attorney general must be at least thirty years old, a citizen of the United States, and have the same qualifications required of a Virginia Circuit Court judge.

Responsibilities
The attorney general represents the legal interests of the people of Virginia and agencies and boards of the state's government. By law, the attorney general must represent the state and its constituent agencies unless it is impractical to do so, in which case private legal representation may be contracted to serve in their place. They are responsible for aiding investigative activities into certain criminals activities, enforcing certain laws, and providing official advice on questions of law to members of the Virginia General Assembly and other state officials.

The office of attorney general is led by the attorney general. Under them serve a chief deputy attorney general, four deputy attorneys general, and various other legal and support staff.

List of attorneys general

Attorneys general of colonial Virginia
Records of this period are sparse. The attorney general was appointed by the King, a combination of the governor and council, or the governor or acting governor. There was no term of office, and the office may have been vacant for extended periods.

Attorneys general (1776–1857)
From 1776 to 1851, the attorney general was elected by the General Assembly, or, in case of vacancy, appointed by the governor for an undefined term. The Virginia Constitution of 1851 introduced popular election and four-year terms. After the 1851 constitution, vacancies would be filled by the General Assembly, if they were in session, or by the governor.

Attorneys general during the Civil War and Reconstruction
Tucker served as the attorney general of Confederate Virginia throughout the Civil War. Wheat and Bowden served as the attorneys general for Restored Government of Virginia. From 1865 to 1870, the commanding general of the military district of Virginia appointed the office.

Attorneys general (1874–present)

References

External links
 Virginia Attorney General official website
 Code of Virginia at Law.Justia.com
 Virginia Attorney General Mark Herring profile at National Association of Attorneys General
 Press releases at Virginia Attorney General